Pasechny is a rural locality (a settlement) in Starooskolsky District, Belgorod Oblast, Russia. The population was 34 as of 2010. There are 2 streets.

Geography 
Pasechny is located 41 km east of Stary Oskol (the district's administrative centre) by road. Frolov is the nearest rural locality.

References 

Rural localities in Starooskolsky District